Route 126 is a North/South provincial highway in the Canadian province of New Brunswick. The road runs from Route 117 intersection in Miramichi. The road has a length of approximately 121 kilometres, and services small, otherwise isolated rural communities. In these areas, the highway is often unofficially referred to as "Main  Street."  The road parallels the New Brunswick East Coast Railway directly to the east. When the highway enters Moncton it changes to Ensley Drive, then Mountain Road.

History

Route 126 was commissioned in 1965 to replace the former route 33. It was shortened in Miramichi in 1997 to end at the new Route 117 bypass, rerouted in the Lutes Mountain area in 1998 to follow a short section of the former Trans-Canada Highway (Route 2), and shortened in Moncton in 2003 when the portion of Mountain Road south of Wheeler Boulevard (Route 15) was turned over to city control.

Intersecting routes
 Route 118 in Miramichi
Route 440 in Rogersville
Route 480 in Acadie Siding
Route 116 in Harcourt and Mortimer
Route 465 in Coal Branch
Route 515 in Hebert
Route 485 in Canaan
Route 2 in Moncton
Route 128 in Moncton

River crossings
 Carding Mill Brook - Miramichi
 Barnaby River - Murray Settlement (2 crossings)
 Kouchibouguacis River - Kent Junction
 Richibucto River - Harcourt
 Canaan River - Canaan Station

Communities along the Route
Miramichi
Nowlanville
Barnaby River
Murray Settlement
Collette
Rogersville
Acadie Siding
Noinville
Kent Junction
Harcourt
Grangeville
Adamsville
Coal Branch
Birch Ridge
Hebert
Canaan Station
Gallagher Ridge
Indian Mountain
Lutes Mountain
Moncton

See also
List of New Brunswick provincial highways

References

124
124
124
124
Transport in Miramichi, New Brunswick
Transport in Moncton